Dalcour is an unincorporated community in Plaquemines Parish, Louisiana, United States.

Notable person
Leander Perez (1891-1969), politician and judge, was born in Dalcour.

Notes

Unincorporated communities in Plaquemines Parish, Louisiana
Unincorporated communities in Louisiana